Iguaraci is a city  in the state of Pernambuco, Brazil. The population in 2020, according with IBGE was 12,247 inhabitants and the total area is 838.12 km². The municipality, has one of the best children's mortality rate (5.7) of all state and, one of the best in Brazil.

Geography

 State - Pernambuco
 Region - Sertão Pernambucano
 Boundaries - Ingazeira, Tuparetama and Tabira   (N);  Custódia and Sertânia   (S);  Tuparetama and Paraiba state  (E);  Afogados da Ingazeira    (W)
 Area - 838.12 km²
 Elevation - 571 m
 Hydrography - Pajeú and Moxotó Rivers
 Vegetation - Caatinga Hiperxerófila
 Climate - Hot tropical
 Annual average temperature - 23.8 c
 Distance to Recife - 356 km

Economy

The main economic activities in Iguaraci are based in commerce and agribusiness, especially creation of goats, cattle, sheep, pigs, chickens;  and plantations of corn and beans.

Economic Indicators

Economy by Sector
2006

Health Indicators

References

Municipalities in Pernambuco